Tinker Bell Talks: Tales of a Pixie Dusted Life is an autobiography by American actress, motivational speaker, radio host and author Margaret Kerry. The memoir recounts the actress' lengthy Hollywood career, her faith and relationships through her life. Starting in childhood appearing in Our Gang comedy shorts, being the reference model for the character of Tinker Bell in Walt Disney's Peter Pan, her appearances on The Lone Ranger and The Andy Griffith Show, and starring in The Ruggles on ABC-TV,  to becoming a voiceover performer, a motivational speaker, and radio host. The book includes 180 photos and artwork.

References

2016 non-fiction books
Autobiographies
American memoirs
Books about entertainers
Show business memoirs
CreateSpace books